Jiří Veselý was the defending champion but lost in the second round to Elias Ymer.

Jaume Munar won the title after defeating Laslo Đere 6–1, 6–3 in the final.

Seeds

Draw

Finals

Top half

Bottom half

External links
 Main Draw
 Qualifying Draw

Moneta Czech Open - Singles
2018 Singles